John 20:9 is the ninth verse of the twentieth chapter of the Gospel of John in the Bible.  Peter and the Beloved Disciple have been examining Jesus' empty tomb and the arrangement of the grave clothes.  John 20:8 states that the Beloved Disciple looked in the tomb and believed, though there is conflict on what exactly he believed.  John 20:9 seems to modify this statement but its exact meaning is also unclear.

Content
In the King James Version of the Bible the text reads:
For as yet they knew not 
the scripture, that he must 
rise again from the dead.

The English Standard Version translates the passage as:
for as yet they did not understand
the Scripture, that he must
rise from the dead.

For a collection of other versions see BibleHub John 20:9

Analysis
Who they refers to is uncertain.  John only makes clear that Peter and the Beloved Disciple were present, but it is possible that Mary Magdalene was also there at this point.  Thus some scholars, such as Hartmann, believe they refers to Peter and Mary who were in ignorance while the Beloved Disciple did understand that Jesus had risen from the dead. The alternative is that they refers to Peter and the Beloved Disciple and shows that they were both still ignorant about the resurrection and that this verse thus clarifies the preceding one and confirms that the Beloved Disciple did not realize that Jesus had risen. Schnackenburg believes that John 20:8, and everything else referring to the Beloved Disciple, is a later addition to the chapter.  In this model 20:9 would follow directly after 20:7 and would clearly be talking about Peter and Mary Magdalene.

Brown reports that the word scripture is singular and most of the time this form is used to refer to a single piece of scripture.  No piece is cited but it is possible the author of John assumed his readers would know what piece was referred to.  Several passages from the Old Testament have been proposed as likely candidates for this source such as Psalm 16, Hosea 6:2, and Jonah 1:17.  Some scholars have also speculated that since the Gospel of John was likely written after most of the New Testament had been penned the author could be referring to one of these works.  Alternatively the singular form of the word scripture was sometimes used to refer to the entire body of scripture and this may be the usage the author intends.

Bultmann has called John 20:9 "a gloss of the ecclesiastical redaction" and argues that the verse is a later addition to the text.  One piece of evidence for this is the phrase "risen from the dead."  The author of John, unlike the other Gospel writers, does not favour the usage of to rise preferring to ascend.  Other scholars believe that the statement is original but misplaced, feeling it should follow John 20:11.  Bruce disagrees arguing that the word for makes the link between 20:8 and 20:9 clear.

References

Further reading
John Calvin's commentary on John 20:1-9
Jesus Appears to His Disciples

20:09